Mount Calm is a town in Hill County, Texas, United States. The population was 320 at the 2010 census.

Geography

Mount Calm is located in southern Hill County at  (31.757680, –96.881931), in Central Texas. Texas State Highway 31 crosses the western corner of the town, leading northeast  to Hubbard and southwest  to Waco.

Demographics

As of the census of 2000, there were 310 people, 118 households, and 82 families residing in the town. The population density was 371.8 people per square mile (144.2/km). There were 138 housing units at an average density of 165.5/sq mi (64.2/km). The racial makeup of the town was 74.52% White, 13.55% African American, 1.61% Native American, 1.61% Asian, 8.39% from other races, and 0.32% from two or more races. Hispanic or Latino of any race were 11.29% of the population.

There were 118 households, out of which 28.8% had children under the age of 18 living with them, 53.4% were married couples living together, 14.4% had a female householder with no husband present, and 30.5% were non-families. 25.4% of all households were made up of individuals, and 11.0% had someone living alone who was 65 years of age or older. The average household size was 2.63 and the average family size was 3.23.

In the town, the population was spread out, with 30.3% under the age of 18, 5.8% from 18 to 24, 23.5% from 25 to 44, 25.8% from 45 to 64, and 14.5% who were 65 years of age or older. The median age was 38 years. For every 100 females, there were 86.7 males. For every 100 females age 18 and over, there were 91.2 males.

The median income for a household in the town was $31,591, and the median income for a family was $34,583. Males had a median income of $32,031 versus $18,571 for females. The per capita income for the town was $13,310. About 9.9% of families and 10.2% of the population were below the poverty line, including 14.1% of those under age 18 and 3.2% of those age 65 or over.

Education
The town is served by the Mount Calm Independent School District.

References

Cities in Texas
Cities in Hill County, Texas